The following is a list of notable people from Zadar (Zara) and the geographical area corresponding to present-day Zadar County.

Artists, musicians and actors

 Steve Bacic (born 1965), actor
 Nikola Bašić (born 1946), architect
 Tomislav Bralić (born 1968), singer
 Natali Dizdar (born 1984), pop singer
 Tullio Carminati (1894–1971), actor
 Gianni Garko (born 1935), actor
 Giorgio da Sebenico (1410–1475), sculptor and architect
 Francesco Laurana (1430–1502), sculptor and architect
 Luciano Laurana (c. 1420 – 1479), architect and engineer
 Tihana Lazović (born 1990), actress
 Ottavio Missoni (1921–2013), designer
 Antun Nalis (1911–2000), actor
 Andrea Schiavone (c. 1510/1515–1563), painter
 Tamara Šoletić (born 1965), actress
 Živko Stojsavljević (1900–1979), painter
 Giorgio Ventura (c. 1570 – c. 1610), painter
 Anđeo Lovrov Zadranin, 14th-century architect
 Juraj Lovrov Zadranin, 14th-century architect
 Antonio Pini-Corsi (1858–1918), opera baritone
 Katija Zubčić (born 1958), actress

Authors

 Juraj Baraković (1548–1628), poet
 Arturo Colautti (1851–1914), journalist, polemicist and librettist
 Vladan Desnica (1905–1967), writer
 Vincenzo Duplancich (1905–1967), journalist
 Riccardo Foster (1869–1939), poet, journalist
 Pavle Kalinić (born 1959), writer
 Brne Karnarutić (1515–1573), poet
 Bartol Kašić (c. 1575 – 1650), scribe, translator
 Stelvio Mestrovich (born 1958), writer, musicologist, and critic
 Pier Alessandro Paravia (1797–1857), writer, scholar, philanthropist and professor of Italian eloquence
 Mima Simić (born 1976), writer, film critic, translator, LGBT activist
 Savo Štrbac (born 1949), author and lawyer
 Tanja Stupar-Trifunović (born 1977), writer
 Jovan Sundečić (1825–1900), poet, Orthodox Christian priest, secretary of Prince Nikola I of Montenegro
 Jeronim Vidulić (c. 1430 – 1499), poet
 Petar Zoranić (c. 1508, died 1543–1569), writer

Military leaders

 Branimir of Croatia (9th century), Croatian leader active in the area of Nin
 Ante Gotovina (born 1955), lieutenant-general
 Furio Lauri (1918–2002), aviator
 Velimir Škorpik, Yugoslav Partisan commander
 Danilo Stanisavljević (1917–1942), uprising leader
 Georg von Trapp (1880–1947), naval officer
 Vladimir Velebit (1907–2004), major-general, lawyer, historian, diplomat
 Ante Zemljar (1922–2004), military officer, poet

Musicians

 Valter Dešpalj (born 1947), cellist and music professor
 Natali Dizdar (born 1984), singer
 Mladen Grdović (born 1958), singer
 Tomislav Ivčić (1953–1993), singer and composer
 Emilija Kokić (born 1968), singer
 Marie Kraja (1911–1999), opera singer
 Ivana Radovniković (born 1985), singer
 Michele Stratico (1728–1783), composer and violinist 
 Felix Weingartner (1863–1942), composer
 Ksenija Zečević (1956–2006), pianist and composer

Politicians

 Ingrid Antičević-Marinović (born 1957), lawyer, politician, Minister of Justice, Public Administration and Local Self-government, justice of the Constitutional Court
 Maks Baće Milić (1914–2005), ambassador, revolutionary
 Sava Bjelanović (1850–1897), politician and journalist
 Andrea Cippico, (1877–1935), Italian senator
 Igor Crnadak (born 1972), politician
 Šime Đodan (1927–2007), politician
 Roberto Ghiglianovich, Italian senator and patriot
 Pavle Kalinić (born 1959), politician and writer
 Božidar Kalmeta (born 1958), politician and Mayor of Zadar
 Tomislav Karamarko (born 1959), politician and First Deputy Prime Minister of Croatia
 Sanja Lakić (born 1994), politician
 Neven Ljubičić (born 1963), politician
 Budimir Lončar (born 1924), politician
 Milorad Pupovac (born 1955), politician
 Petar Škundrić (born 1947), politician
 Enrico Tivaroni (1841–1925), Italian senator and magistrate
 Lucio Toth (1934–2017), politician
 Slobodan Uzelac (born 1947), politician
 Giacomo Vuxani (1886–1964), politician
 Luigi Ziliotto, politician, podestà of Zadar (Zara) (1863–1922)

Historians and scientists

 Silvio Ballarin (1901 – 1969), mathematician and university professor
 Zoran Bujas (1910–2004), psychiatrist
 Spiridon Brusina (1845 – 1909), malacologist
 Aldo Duro (1916–2000), linguist
 Giovanni Francesco Fortunio (ca. 1470–1517), grammarian, jurist and humanist.
 Renzo de' Vidovich (born 1934), politician, historian and journalist
 Jevrem Jezdić (1916 – 1997), historian, publicist, writer
 Boris Labar (born 1947), physician and scientist in the field of hematology and hematopoietic stem cell transplantation
 Josef Müller (1880–1964), entomologist
 Simone Stratigo (1733–1824), mathematician and a nautical science
 Carlo Tivaroni (1843–1906), historian and politician
 Carlo Viola (1855–1925), geologist
 Predrag Vranicki (1922–2002), Marxist humanist and philosopher
 Obrad Zelić (born in 1946), professor of parodontology and oral medicine

Athletes 

 Vladan Alanović (born 1967), basketball player
 Romano Bajlo (born 1946), rower
 Marko Banić (born 1984), basketball player
 Ivan Batur (born 1991), basketball player
 Saša Bjelanović (born 1979), football player
 Ante Bukvić, football player
 Jurica Buljat (born 1986), football player
 Marijan Buljat (born 1981), football player
 Marjan Čakarun (born 1990), basketball player
 Antonio Cattalinich (Ante Katalinić) (1895–1981), rower
 Francesco Cattalinich (Frane Katalinić) (1891–1976), rower
 Simone Cattalinich (Šimun Katalinić) (1891–1976), rower
 Stefan Cebara (born 1991), football player
 Đorđe Čotra (born 1984), football player
 Ljubomir Crnokrak (born 1958), football manager
 Aleksandar Čubrilo (born 1975), basketball player
 Branko Culina (born 1957), football player and trainer
 Hrvoje Ćustić (1983–2008), football player
 Joey Didulica (born 1997), football player whose parents were from Zadar
 Toni Dijan (born 1983), basketball player
 Saša Dobrić (born 1982), football player
 Šime Fantela (born 1986), sailor
 Đorđe Gagić (born 1990), basketball player
 Latino Galasso (1898–1949), rower
 Josip (Giuseppe, "Pino") Gjergja (born 1937), basketball player
 Alan Gregov (born 1970), basketball player
 Šime Gregov (born 1989), footballer
 Petar Ivanov (rower) (Pietro Ivanov) (1894–1961), rower
 Danijel Jusup (born 1961), basketball coach
 Ratko Kacian (1917–1949), football player
 Arijan Komazec, basketball player
 Emilio Kovačić (born 1968), basketball player
 Ante Krapić (born 1985), basketball player
 Marko Jagodić-Kuridža (born 1987), basketball player
 Dominik Livaković (born 1995), football player
 Mark Liveric (born 1953), football player
 Viktor Ljubić (Vittorio Gliubich) (1902–1984), rower
 Korana Longin-Zanze (born 1973), basketball player
 Oliver Maric (born 1981), football player
 Petar Marić (born 1987), basketball player
 Dominik Mavra (born 1994), basketball player
 Vladimir Milić (born 1955), shot putter
 Roko Mišlov (born 1988), football player
 Luka Modrić (born 1985), football player
 Vedran Morović (born 1983), basketball player
 Ivan Ninčević (born 1981), handball player
 Ivan Novačić (born 1985), basketball player
 Bernarda Pera (born 1994), tennis player
 Joseph Plachutta (1827–1883), chess player
 Nikola Plećaš (born 1948), basketball player
 Marko Popović (born 1982), basketball player
 Herdi Prenga (born 1994), football player
 Zoran Primorac (born 1969), table tennis player
 Dado Pršo (born 1974), football player
 Milan Pršo (born 1990), football player
 Marija Režan (born 1989), basketball player
 Tullio Rochlitzer (1926–2006), basketball player and coach
 Ivan Santini (born 1989), football player
 Josip Skoblar (born 1941), football player
 Branko Skroče (born 1955), basketball player
 Bruno Sorić (Bruno Sorich) (1904–1942), rower
 Enzo Sovitti (1926–1969), basketball player and coach
 Danijel Subašić (born 1984), football player
 Marin Tomasov (born 1987), football player
 Carlo Toniatti (1892–1968), rower
 Sergio Vatta (1937–2020), football coach
 Dušan Vemić (born 1976), tennis player
 Dalibor Veselinović (born 1987), football player
 Jakov Vladović (born 1983), basketball player
 Stojko Vranković (born 1964), basketball player
 Luka Žorić (born 1984), basketball player
 Tomislav Zubčić (born 1990), basketball player
 Jurica Žuža (born 1978), basketball player

Religion

 Šime Budinić (17th century), priest
 Čika (died 1095), founder of the Benedictine monastery of St. Mary
 Donatus of Zadar, Catholic saint and bishop
 Gregory of Nin (10th century), bishop active in the area of Nin
 Pope John IV (died 12 October 642) reigned from 24 December 640 to his death in 642.
 Simeon Končarević, Serbian Orthodox bishop
 Nikolaj Mandić (1840–1907), theologian
 Marijan Oblak (1919–2008), Roman Catholic archbishop of the Archdiocese of Zadar
 Ivan Prenđa (1939–2010), Roman Catholic archbishop of the Archdiocese of Zadar
 Jakov Varingez (1400–1496), Roman Catholic professed religious of the Order of Friars Minor
 Vekenega (died 1111), abbess of the Benedictine monastery of St. Mary
 Gerasim Zelić (1752–1828), Serbian Orthodox Church archimandrite, traveller and writer

Other

 Helen of Zadar (?-976), queen consort of the Kingdom of Croatia
 Toni Jeričević (born 1983), businessman, actor, TV host
 Franco Luxardo (born 1936), entrepreneur and fencer
 Girolamo Luxardo (1784–1865), entrepreneur, diplomat
 Girolamo Manfrin (1742–1801), entrepreneur 
 Joanna II of Naples (1373–1435),  Queen of Naples

References

 
Zadar County